Colasposoma densatum is a species of leaf beetle of Saudi Arabia and Yemen described by Léon Fairmaire in 1887.

References

densatum
Beetles of Asia
Insects of the Arabian Peninsula
Taxa named by Léon Fairmaire
Beetles described in 1887